Leo S. Olschki Editore is a publishing house of Florence, Tuscany, Italy.

History 
It was founded in 1886 by Leo Samuele Olschki and is among the country's oldest publishers of critical work in the humanities.

See also
 Books in Italy
 Physis (journal)

Notes

External links

Book publishing companies of Italy
Publishing companies established in 1886
Companies based in Tuscany
Mass media in Florence